Football at the Summer Olympics, referred to as the Olympic Football Tournament, has been included in every Summer Olympic Games as a men's competition sport, except 1896 (the inaugural Games) and 1932 (in an attempt to promote the new FIFA World Cup tournament). Women's football was added to the official program at the Atlanta 1996 Games.

In order to avoid competition with the World Cup, FIFA have restricted participation of elite players in the men's tournament in various ways: currently, squads for the men's tournament are required to be composed of players under 23 years of age, with three permitted exceptions.

By comparison, the women's football tournament is a full senior-level international tournament, second in prestige only to the FIFA Women's World Cup.

History

Pre-World Cup era

Beginnings
Football was not included in the program at the first modern Olympic Games in Athens in 1896, as international football was in its infancy at the time. However, sources claim that an unofficial football tournament was organised during the first competition, with participating teams including Athens and Smyrna (Izmir), then part of the Ottoman Empire. According to Bill Mallon's research, this is an error which has been perpetuated in multiple texts.

Tournaments were played at the 1900 and 1904 games and the Intercalated Games of 1906, but these were contested by various clubs and scratch teams. Although the IOC considers the 1900 and 1904 tournaments to be official Olympic events, they are not recognised by FIFA, and neither recognises the Intercalated Games today. In 1906 teams from Great Britain, Germany, Austria, the Netherlands and France withdrew from an unofficial competition and left Denmark, Smyrna (one Armenian, two Frenchmen and eight Britons), Athens and Thessaloniki to compete. Denmark won the final against Athens 9–0.

British successes
In the London Games of 1908 a proper international tournament was organised by the Football Association, featuring just six teams. The number of teams rose to eleven in 1912, when the competition was organised by the Swedish Football Association. Many of these early matches were unbalanced, as evidenced by high scoring games; two players, Sophus Nielsen in 1908 and Gottfried Fuchs in 1912, each scored ten goals in a single match. All players were amateurs, in accordance with the Olympic rules, which meant that countries could not send their full senior national teams. The National Olympic Committee for Great Britain and Ireland asked the Football Association to send an English national amateur team. Some of the English members played with professional clubs, most notably Derby County's Ivan Sharpe, Bradford City F.C. Harold Walden and Chelsea's Vivian Woodward. England won the first two official tournaments convincingly, beating Denmark both times.

1920s and the rise of Uruguay

During the 1920 final against Belgium, the Czechoslovakia national football team walked off the field to protest the refereeing of John Lewis and the militarised mood within the stadium in Antwerp. This would be the final all-European football competition at the Olympic games, with Egypt, the United States, and Uruguay participating in 1924. With teams from new regions the quality of play increased, as did fan interest. Uruguay dominated the tournament, winning their four games by a combined score of 15-1: the final was a 3–0 victory over Switzerland. In 1928, football was the most popular event at the games and the final was an all-South American affair. Because no other major international tournament existed yet, Uruguay defeated Argentina 2–1 in what David Goldblatt says was "football's first world championship". After these tournaments, FIFA realized that the Olympic movement prevented nations from competing on an equal footing and, given that the Olympics only permitted amateurs to participate, did not represent the true strength of the international game. The popularity of international soccer gave FIFA the incentive to create an international tournament, and FIFA began organising the World Cup.

After the first World Cup

Tumultuous '30s
Following Jules Rimet's proposal in 1929 to initiate a professional World Championship of Football, the sport was dropped from the 1932 Los Angeles Games by FIFA in an attempt to promote the new tournament. Football returned to controversy at the 1936 Berlin Games. The German organisers were intent on the return of the game to the Olympic movement since it guaranteed income into the organisation's coffers. The Italian team intimidated a referee. Peru scored a contested victory over Austria in overtime, with a fan invasion of the field at the very end.  The Austrian team asked for the result to be annulled, and the game repeated. FIFA agreed, but the Peruvian team refused and left the Olympics.

Soviet Bloc dominance amid amateurism controversy
As professionalism spread around the world, the gap in quality between the World Cup and the Olympics widened. The countries that benefited most were the Soviet Bloc countries of Eastern Europe, where top athletes were state-sponsored while retaining their status as amateurs. As a result, young Western amateurs had to face seasoned and veteran Soviet Bloc teams, which put them at a significant disadvantage. All Olympic football tournaments from 1948 to 1980 were dominated by the Soviet Union and its satellites. Between 1948 and 1980, 23 out of 28 Olympic medals were won by Eastern Europe, with only Sweden (gold in 1948 and bronze in 1952), Denmark (bronze in 1948 and silver in 1960) and Japan (bronze in 1968) breaking their dominance. The next two tournaments see some changes due to FIFA's changing of the call-up rules, with only Yugoslavia (bronze in 1984) and the Soviet Union (gold in 1988) winning medals for the Eastern Bloc.

Changes and developments
For the 1984 Los Angeles Games, the IOC decided to admit professional players, however, FIFA still did not want the Olympics to rival the World Cup.

A compromise was struck that allowed teams from countries outside of UEFA and CONMEBOL to field their strongest sides, while restricting UEFA and CONMEBOL (the strongest confederations whose teams had played all finals and won every single World Cup title) countries to players who had not played in a World Cup.

The 1984 rules were maintained also for the 1988 edition, but with an additional rider: any European and South American footballers who had previously played less than 90 minutes in one single match of the World Cup, were eligible.

1992–present: Age restrictions introduced
Since 1992, male competitors have been required to be under 23 years old, and since 1996, a maximum of three over-23-year-old players have been allowed per squad.  African countries have taken particular advantage of this, with Nigeria and Cameroon winning in 1996 and 2000 respectively.

Because of the unusual format and the separation from the main national teams that play the World Cup and top continental tournaments, historically strong men's national teams have unimpressive Olympic records. Uruguay, who won the two tournaments prior to the World Cup's creation, only qualified again in 2012, after an 84-year absence. Argentina won silver twice (1928 and 1996) before the 2004 tournament, but its appearance in Athens 2004, in which it won the first gold medal, was only their seventh overall. Brazil's silver medals in the 1984, 1988 and 2012 editions were the best they had achieved until 2016's gold. Italy has only won the Olympic title once, in 1936, although along with the two bronzes, the team has the highest number of appearances in the tournament, with 15, the last in 2008. France won the Olympic title in 1984, but only qualified twice ever since. A team from Germany won the gold medal only once, in 1976 (East Germany), and the reunified team did not make an Olympic appearance until 2016, when they won silver. Spain has won gold as hosts in 1992, and followed it with two silver medals (in 2000 and 2020, having also won a third in 1920), along with a few failures to qualify.

British non-involvement

Football in the United Kingdom has no single governing body, and there are separate teams for the UK's four Home Nations: England, Northern Ireland, Scotland and Wales. Further to this, only the English Football Association (FA) is affiliated to the British Olympic Association (BOA), and the FA entered "Great Britain" teams to the football tournaments until 1972.

In 1974, the FA abolished the distinction between "amateur" and "professional" football, and ceased to enter the Olympics. Even though FIFA has allowed professionals at the Olympics since 1984, the FA did not re-enter, as the Home Nations were concerned that a united British Olympic team would set a precedent that might cause FIFA to question their separate status in other FIFA competitions, and even their status on and/or the existence of the International Football Association Board.

When London was selected to host the 2012 Games, there was pressure on the English FA to exercise the host nation's automatic right to field a team. In 2009 the plan agreed by the FA with the Welsh FA, Scottish FA and Irish FA was only to field English players; however the BOA overruled this, and ultimately there were Welsh players in the men's squad and Scots players in the women's squad. After the 2012 games, the FA decided that no team would be entered in subsequent men's tournaments, but was open to fielding a women's team again. The distinction recognised the importance and status of Olympic football in the women's international game.

For the 2020 tournament, FIFA stated that the women's UK team (not applied to the men's UK team) may enter the Olympics after the four FAs agreed, depending on the performance of women's English team in 2019 FIFA Women's World Cup (which serves as the European qualification for the Olympics). This brought women's football under the BOA jurisdiction in line with the long standing qualification rules in Field hockey and Rugby sevens, although the home nation's sevens teams were subsumed into a standing Great Britain team in 2022

Venues

Counting the 2016 and 2020 Summer Olympics, there are 127 venues that have hosted Olympic football, the most of any sport.

Events

Competition format
For both the men's and women's tournaments, the competition consists of a round-robin group stage followed by a knockout stage. Teams are placed into groups of 4 teams, with each team playing each other team in its group once. Teams earn 3 points for a win, 1 point for a draw, and 0 points for a loss. The top two teams in each group (as well as the top two third-place finishers, in the women's tournament) advance to the knockout rounds. The knockout rounds are a single-elimination tournament consisting of quarterfinals, semifinals, and the gold and bronze medal matches.

Matches consist of two halves of 45 minutes each. Since 2004, during the knockout rounds, if the match is tied after 90 minutes, two 15-minute halves of extra time are played (extra time is skipped in favour of immediate penalty kicks in the bronze medal match if it is played on the same day in the same stadium as the gold medal match). If the score remains tied, penalty kicks, which is 5 rounds, plus extra rounds if tied, are used to determine the winner.

The qualifying tournament, like that for the World Cup, is organised along continental lines. Most continental confederations organise a special Under-23 qualifying tournament, although the European qualifiers are drawn from the finalists of the UEFA Under-21 Championship. Teams participating in the preliminary and final competitions must be composed of U-23 players, with up to three players who are at least 23. For Paris 2024, U-23 players were born after 1 January 2001.

For the 2024 Games, the number of places allocated to each continent is:
Europe – 4 (includes host France)
Asia – 3 or 4
Africa – 3 or 4
South America – 2
North America – 2
Oceania – 1

Team variants

Men
1900–1904: Club teams
1908–1964: National teams
1968–1980: National amateur teams
1984–1988: National teams (with UEFA/CONMEBOL restrictions)
1992: National U23 team 
1996–present: National U23 team (with three overage players)

Women
1996–present: National team

Men's tournament

Participating nations
Numbers refer to the final placing of each team at the respective Games. Host nation is shown in bold.

Results 

Rules
 1896–1904: club teams
 1908–1980: amateur national teams
 1984–1988: professional national teams (except UEFA and CONMEBOL)
 1992: u-23 national teams 
 1996–present: u-23 national teams (with three 'no age limit' players allowed, after an agreement between FIFA and IOC)
Keys
  Contested by club teams instead of proper national squads
  Playoff match after the final ended in a tie

Notes

Performances by countries
Below are the 41 nations that have reached at least the semi-final stage in the Summer Olympics finals.

Women's tournament

The women's tournament is contested between the full senior national teams, with no restrictions. One place is reserved for the host country. Of the remaining teams, as in World Cup contests a specific number of places are reserved for teams from each continental region; the European (UEFA) teams until 2020 are chosen from the most successful European teams in the previous year's World Cup; the UEFA Women's Nations League which its Finals is held in the same year as the Olympics will be used from 2024, while the other continental regions host their own qualifying tournaments in the build-up to the Olympics.

The first women's tournament was at the 1996 Atlanta Games. The United States won the gold medal.  defeated the U.S. in 2000 by a golden goal that was highly controversial and seemed like a handball, but was allowed to stand. The finals of the next two tournaments, in 2004 and 2008, also went to extra time, with the U.S. defeating  both times. In 2012 the U.S. won their fourth gold medal defeating Japan 2–1 in the final. In 2016 Germany won its first gold, defeating in the final Sweden, who upset in the succession the U.S. and hosts Brazil.  In 2020, Canada won gold on penalties over Sweden, having previously also beaten Brazil and the U.S.

Allocation of places for each continent in the 2024 Games is:
Europe – 3 (includes host France)
Africa – 2
Asia – 2
South America – 2 
North America – 2
Oceania – 1

Participating nations
Numbers refer to the final placing of each team at the respective Games. Host nation is shown in bold.

Results

Keys
 a.e.t. – after extra time
 a.s.d.e.t. – after sudden death extra time

Performances by countries 
Below are the ten nations that have reached at least the semi-final stage in the Summer Olympics finals.

Overall medal table
 Total medals won (men's and women's) including 1900 and 1904
 Bronze medals shared in 1972 tournament

See also
 Football at the Youth Olympic Games

Notes

References

Works cited

External links

 Football news and highlight at Olympics.com 
 Men's Olympic Football at FIFA.com 
 Women's Olympic Football at FIFA.com 
 Football Tournament of the Olympic Games – Overview at the RSSSF

 
Olympic Games
Sports at the Summer Olympics
Olympics